Hosston is a village in Caddo Parish, Louisiana, United States. The population was 318 at the 2010 census. It is part of the Shreveport–Bossier City Metropolitan Statistical Area.

Geography
U.S. Route 71 runs through the center of the village, leading south  to Shreveport and north  to the Arkansas line at Ida. Louisiana Highway 2 runs west from Hosston  to Vivian and east  to Plain Dealing.

Climate
The climate in this area is characterized by hot, humid summers and generally mild to cool winters.  According to the Köppen Climate Classification system, Hosston has a humid subtropical climate, abbreviated "Cfa" on climate maps.

Demographics

As of the census of 2000, there were 387 people, 152 households, and 101 families residing in the village. The racial makeup of the village was 77.00% White, 22.48% African American, 0.26% Asian, and 0.26% from two or more races. Hispanic or Latino of any race were 0.26% of the population.

There were 152 households, out of which 29.6% had children under the age of 18 living with them, 53.3% were married couples living together, 10.5% had a female householder with no husband present, and 32.9% were non-families. 28.3% of all households were made up of individuals, and 15.1% had someone living alone who was 65 years of age or older. The average household size was 2.55 and the average family size was 3.20.

In the village, the population was spread out, with 26.6% under the age of 18, 5.7% from 18 to 24, 26.4% from 25 to 44, 21.4% from 45 to 64, and 19.9% who were 65 years of age or older. The median age was 41 years. For every 100 females, there were 97.4 males. For every 100 females age 18 and over, there were 94.5 males.

The median income for a household in the village was $22,500, and the median income for a family was $26,250. Males had a median income of $25,179 versus $18,125 for females. The per capita income for the village was $12,282. About 24.1% of families and 27.8% of the population were below the poverty line, including 36.7% of those under age 18 and 15.3% of those age 65 or over.

Gallery

References

Villages in Caddo Parish, Louisiana
Villages in Louisiana
Villages in Shreveport – Bossier City metropolitan area